= Adinegoro Award =

Indonesian journalism award

Adinegoro Award (Indonesian: Hadiah Adinegoro [haˌdiah adinəˈɡɔrɔ]) is the highest award for a work of journalism in Indonesia. Nominees come from the writings entitled "National Development" which is mentioned in the press. The award is intended to improve the quality of Indonesian journalism. It has been awarded since 1974 by the Foundation for Journalism Adinegoro Award, Persatuan Wartawan Indonesia or PWI.

Past winners include Kamus Kemajuan, Melawat ke Barat, Perang Dunia I, Tiongkok Pusaran Asia, Revolusi dan Kebudayaan, Filsafat Ratu Dunia, Atlas Tanah Air, and Ilmu Jiwa Seseorang.
